The Singapore Army is the land service branch of the Singapore Armed Forces (SAF). The largest of the four branches of the SAF, the Singapore Army traces its origins to the 1st Battalion, Singapore Infantry Regiment (1 SIR), which was formed in 1957, when Singapore was still under British colonial rule. After Singapore's independence on 9 August 1965, the Singapore Army Bill was passed in Parliament on 23 December 1965, and National Service (NS) was subsequently introduced in 1967. Mostly made up of conscripts, the Singapore Army can mobilise all operationally-ready military reservists in the event of war or national exigencies.

Mission 
The mission of the Singapore Armed Forces (SAF) is to deter armed aggression, and to secure a swift and decisive victory should deterrence fail. The Army is also tasked with conducting peace-time operations to further Singapore's national interests and foreign policy. These range from disaster relief to peacekeeping, hostage rescue and other contingencies.

The Army views technology as a force-multiplier and a means to sustain combat power given Singapore's population constraints. Jointness across four branches of the SAF is integral to the Army's warfighting doctrine. Joint operations undertaken with the Navy and Air Force include amphibious landings and critical disaster relief operations in the aftermath of the 2004 Indian Ocean earthquake and tsunami.

The Army has a technically proficient, relatively well-educated draftee pool and officer corps (non-commissioned and commissioned) reflective of the population at large, and has sought to leverage this to ease its transition into a more sophisticated, networked fighting force.

Combat readiness is a linchpin of Army policy, and military exercises up to divisional level are conducted many times yearly, simulating full-spectrum operations, up to and including full-scale war. Divisional war games are a combined arms, tri-service affair involving the Navy and Air Force. Because training space is limited in Singapore—artillery fire would quickly traverse the island—some military exercises are conducted overseas. Reservists periodically train abroad, their units regularly evaluated for combat readiness. The Army also trains bilaterally with some host nations, and military exchanges are frequent. Training is billed as "tough, realistic and safe," with a premium on safety, given the sensitivity of military deaths in a largely conscript army.

Following the revolution in military affairs, and in tandem with modernising its weapons systems, the Army is forging a transition to a more network-centric fighting doctrine that better integrates the Air Force and Navy.

History 
The Singapore Army originated with two infantry battalions, the 1st and 2nd Battalions, Singapore Infantry Regiment (1 SIR and 2 SIR), which were respectively formed in 1957 and 1962 when Singapore was still a British colony. After a merger with Malaysia which resulted in separation in 1965, Singapore passed the Singapore Army Bill in Parliament on 23 December 1965 and gained complete control of the two battalions from Malaysia in January 1966. At the time, the Singapore Army had only the two infantry battalions and the old Singapore Volunteer Artillery Corps. Months later, the Army had a reserve force, the People's Defence Force, which was formed from an old volunteer unit mobilised for service during the Indonesia–Malaysia confrontation. A third battalion, the 10th Battalion, People's Defence Force (10 PDF), was raised as a volunteer infantry reserve battalion.

In 1967, Parliament passed the National Service (Amendment) Act, introducing National Service (conscription) for all able-bodied young men aged 18 and above. In June 1967, the Singapore Army introduced its first artillery battalion, the 20th Singapore Artillery Battalion (20 SAB). Two new infantry battalions, the 3rd and 4th Battalions, Singapore Infantry Regiment (3 SIR and 4 SIR) were formed in August 1967. In November 1968, the Singapore Army's first armoured battalion, 41st Battalion, Singapore Armoured Regiment (41 SAR), was formed. This was followed by the creation of the 1st Commando Battalion (1 Cdo Bn) in December 1969.

In 1972, Parliament passed the Singapore Armed Forces Act to reorganise and consolidate the Singapore Armed Forces' disparate commands and administrative functions.

Description of Logo
The emblem's escutcheon reads "Tentera Singapura" (meaning "Singapore Army" in Malay). The national coat of arms sits in its interior. The motto is "Yang Pertama Dan Utama" ("first and foremost" in Malay). Two stalks of laurel flank the escutcheon. The laurels are green for the Singapore Army and gold for the Singapore Armed Forces.

Operations 
The Singapore Army has participated in peacekeeping operations overseas. In the aftermath of the Gulf War, Singapore contributed to the United Nations Iraq–Kuwait Observation Mission (UNIKOM) formed in 1991. From May 2007 to June 2013, the Singapore Army deployed about 500 personnel to join the International Security Assistance Force (ISAF) in maintaining stability and assist in reconstruction in war-torn Afghanistan. Since 2014, the Singapore Army has provided logistical support to the international coalition in the War against the Islamic State.

List of chiefs of Army

Organisation

The Army is headed by the Chief of Army, who is assisted by the Chief of Staff – General Staff and the Sergeant Major of the Army. The General Staff consists of six branches from G1 to G6, as well as a National Service Affairs Department handling National Service issues, and an Army Safety Inspectorate. The six branches handle issues relating to personnel (G1), intelligence (G2), operations (G3), logistics (G4), plans (G5) and training (G6). The G1, G2, G3, G5, and G6 branches are each headed by an Assistant Chief of General Staff. Among the General Staff, there is also a Chief Systems Integration Officer and a Head of the Army Information Centre.

The commanders of Training & Doctrine Command (TRADOC), Combat Service Support (CSS), the four main divisions, the two operational reserve divisions, the 15 formations of the Army, and the SAF Volunteer Corps also report to the Chief of Army.

Divisions
The Army has six divisions, of which three are combined arms divisions, one is in charge of counter-terrorism and homeland security, and two are army operational reserves (AOR).

The three combined arms divisions are the 3rd Division (3 DIV), 6th Division (6 DIV) and 9th Division (9 DIV), each of which has active and reserve units that are operationally ready and capable of being mobilised in the event of war.

The 2nd People's Defence Force (2 PDF) is in charge of counter-terrorism and homeland security, including the protection of key military and civilian installations around Singapore. It is also responsible for the coordination and secondment of military resources to civilian agencies in the event of a civil emergency.

The two AOR divisions are the 21st Division (21 DIV) and 25th Division (25 DIV).

Formations
The Army has 15 formations: Ammunition Command, Armour, Army Intelligence, Army Medical Services, Artillery, Combat Engineers, Commandos, Guards, Infantry, Maintenance and Engineering Support, Military Police Command, Personnel Command, Signals, Supply, and Transport.

Task forces
The Army has task forces such as the Island Defence Task Force (IDTF), Joint Task Force (JTF), Special Operations Task Force (SOTF) and the Army Deployment Force (ADF).

Equipment

Camps and bases

Photo gallery

See also 
 Singapore Armed Forces
 Republic of Singapore Air Force
 Republic of Singapore Navy
 Singapore Special Operations Force
 Singapore Armed Forces ranks

References 
Notes

Bibliography

 Tim, Huxley. Defending the Lion City: the Armed Forces of Singapore. Publisher: Allen & Unwin Pty LTD, 2000. .

Further reading
 'Singapore's Army: boosting capabilities,' Jane's Intelligence Review, April 1996

External links 

 
 Singapore Army Official Ranks Website
 Ranks and Paramilitary Ranks of Singapore, accessed 23 October 2006.
 Singapore Infantry Regiment pictures and info